The Wolf Among Us is an episodic graphic mystery-drama adventure game developed by Telltale Games, based on Bill Willingham's Fables comic book series, to which it serves as a prequel. The game consists of five episodes that were released throughout 2013 and 2014. Retail versions for the PlayStation 3, PlayStation 4, PlayStation Vita, Xbox 360, and Xbox One consoles were made available in November 2014. In the game, players control Bigby Wolf, the sheriff of Fabletown – a clandestine community within 1980s New York City consisting of various fantastical characters from fairy tales and folklore – and must investigate a series of mysterious murders; the first ones to occur in Fabletown in a long time.

The Wolf Among Us has been generally well received by critics and garnered a cult following. In July 2017, Telltale announced that a second season of The Wolf Among Us was scheduled for release in 2018. However, Telltale eventually had to shut down for financial reasons in 2018, with its assets being acquired by LCG Entertainment. One of the first original games from this new company, doing business as Telltale Games, will be a sequel to The Wolf Among Us, titled The Wolf Among Us 2, which was announced in December 2019.

Gameplay

The Wolf Among Us is a graphic adventure game, played from a third-person perspective. The player controls protagonist Bigby Wolf, who must investigate a series of mysterious murders. Throughout the game, the player explores various three-dimensional environments, such as apartment buildings and a bar. When exploring an environment, the player may find an object they can interact with; when this occurs, they must move a cursor over the object to select and examine it. Items of interest are stored in an inventory, and can be used later in the story. The player may also talk with non-player characters, and see the conversations presented in the form of dialogue trees. The dialogue options chosen during conversations would either have a positive or negative effect on how other characters view Bigby, and their perceptions would influence future events in the story. Some scenes are more action-oriented, forcing the player to respond to a series of quick time event (QTE) prompts. The player is not required to complete every QTE prompt, and skipping certain prompts may affect future events in the story.

Synopsis

Setting
The Wolf Among Us is set in the year 1986, nearly twenty years before the events of Fables. For years, many of the magical lands described in myth, legend, and folklore (known as The Homelands) have been occupied by an enigmatic tyrant known as the Adversary. To escape the Adversary's totalitarian regime, many of The Homelands inhabitants (collectively known as Fables) fled to colonial America, and created an enclave known as Fabletown, now located in modern-day Manhattan. To mask their presence from the native humans (referred to as "mundys"), all non-human Fables have to purchase an enchantment known as a "glamour" which allows them to appear human, otherwise they will be relocated to a rural community known as "The Farm".

Characters

The protagonist of The Wolf Among Us is Bigby Wolf (Adam Harrington), formerly the Big Bad Wolf. He is the sheriff of Fabletown, currently working at the "Business Office" under corrupt interim mayor Ichabod Crane (Roger L. Jackson), aided by Snow White (Erin Yvette) and the Magic Mirror (Gavin Hammon) in his investigation along with the help of Bufkin the winged monkey (Chuck Kourouklis) that manages Fabletown's records. Aristocrat Bluebeard (Dave Fennoy) also works at the Office though his motives are unclear. Bigby resides at the Woodlands apartments where Colin (Brian Sommer), one of the Three Little Pigs, occasionally crashes at his place. Beauty and the Beast (Melissa Hutchison and Gavin Hammon) are also residents of the Woodlands, though currently struggling with a troubled marriage. One of the Fables that Bigby frequently contacts is Mr. Toad (Chuck Kourouklis) and his son TJ (Melissa Hutchison), who live in a run-down apartment building nearby.

In the first episode, the player is introduced to The Woodsman (Adam Harrington), who lives in the same building as Mr. Toad. Standing in Bigby's way are Dee and Dum Tweedle (Gavin Hammon), twin private investigators and criminals. Bigby also encounters Holly (Janet Lipsey), a Troll who runs the Trip Trap bar, and  barfly Grendel (Kid Beyond). The second episode introduces trickster and thief Jack Horner (Colin Benoit), Georgie Porgie (Kevin Howarth), a pimp and the owner of the Pudding & Pie strip club, along with prostitute Nerissa (Molly Benson), the former Little Mermaid, Vivian (Sandy Delonga), Georgie's lover, and Clever Hans (Ben Knoll), the club's bouncer. The third episode introduces the janitor Flycatcher (Dustin Rubin), the Crooked Man (Philip Banks), a loan shark with a large influence in Fabletown, Bloody Mary (Kathryn Cressida), a sadistic minion of the Crooked Man (Philip Banks), and Aunty Greenleaf (Laura Bailey), a rogue witch who illegally sells cheap black-market glamours to Fables. The fourth episode introduces the Jersey Devil (Bobby Vickers), the manager of the Lucky Pawn shop and another minion of the Crooked Man; and Johann the butcher (Terry McGovern), the former owner of the Cut Above butcher shop who has been forced out of his business by the Crooked Man's henchmen.

Plot
This is a broad overview of the plot. Certain decisions made by the player will alter details of specific events.

Bigby Wolf, formerly the Big Bad Wolf, is the Sheriff of Fabletown, a hidden community of fairytale characters located in 1980s New York City. Receiving a call from Mr. Toad, Bigby protects a prostitute from an intoxicated Woodsman. Before she departs, she tells him he is not as bad as everyone says he is. Later that night, Bigby and Snow White find the woman's head left on the Woodlands doorstep. Clues left with the head identify her as Faith, a Fable from Allerleirauh. Deputy Mayor Ichabod Crane orders him and Snow to investigate her death. They head to the apartment she shared with her husband Prince Lawrence and find the Tweedles, Dee and Dum, snooping through it. Bigby pursues them, but they escape. He and Snow then learn that Lawrence and Faith struggled to make ends meet and Faith took up prostitution to help pay the bills. Bigby leaves Snow at the Woodlands while he continues to trace leads. When he returns, he finds the Woodlands surrounded by police, Snow's head sitting on the building's steps.

Bigby is taken in for questioning by the mundy police, but Crane uses a spell to wipe the incident from the police's minds. When they return, they are surprised to find Snow alive; the head, actually that of a troll named Lily, was disguised by a black-market glamour. Bigby tracks Lily's connections to the Pudding & Pie, a strip club run by Georgie Porgie, but Georgie claims innocence. Another prostitute, Nerissa, cryptically directs Bigby to a nearby hotel room, where he finds Lily's blood and photographic evidence of Crane engaging in sexual acts with Lily glamoured to look like Snow. After informing Snow of this, they race back to the Woodlands to find Crane gone, and the Magic Mirror, which could have revealed his location, shattered with one shard missing.

Bigby follows a trail of clues to Crane's whereabouts to the apartment of Aunty Greenleaf, a witch that makes the black-market glamours. Along the way, he discovers that Crane has been embezzling money from Fabletown over the years to pay off a loan shark known as the Crooked Man. Greenleaf points Bigby and Snow back to the Pudding & Pie. Storming the club, they find Crane trying to extract information out of the prostitutes to prove his innocence. Though Snow realizes Crane was not the murderer, he is nonetheless arrested for embezzlement, but as they leave the club, the Crooked Man and his henchmen, the Tweedles and Bloody Mary, confront them. Mary and the Tweedles goad Bigby into his werewolf form, and a fight breaks out. When Mary critically wounds Bigby with a silver bullet, Snow stops the fight and willingly gives up Crane to save Bigby's life.

Back at the Woodlands, Bigby struggles to find clues when Nerissa appears. He realizes the ribbon she wears prevents her from speaking the truth, that Faith wore an identical ribbon, and that she died when it was removed. He follows another trail of clues, and finds evidence of the black-market glamour ring in the Cut Above butcher shop, a pawn shop called the Lucky Pawn owned by Jersey Devil through which the Crooked Man distributes his loans, and Crane's presence, as well as the missing Mirror Shard. The Mirror reveals Mary putting Crane onto an overseas flight to Paris to keep him from talking, and the next location of the door to the Crooked Man's lair, which moves around the city.

Bigby enters the Crooked Man's lair alone, meeting him and his agents. The Crooked Man reveals Georgie as Faith and Lily's killer and claims he misunderstood his orders to deal with them, but Georgie asserts the Crooked Man told him to kill the women. A fight ensues and the Crooked Man and a fatally stabbed Georgie escape. When Bigby pursues the dying Georgie and his lover Vivian to the Pudding & Pie, she explains that the Crooked Man and Georgie were trying to stop a plot spearheaded by Faith with the other prostitutes to escape their forced servitude. Vivian is revealed to be the original girl with a ribbon around her neck, and have made copies of it to trap other women and force them to work for Georgie. Regretting her actions, Vivian undoes her ribbon, severing her head and breaking the spell.

Bigby finds the Crooked Man hiding in an old foundry, and after turning into his true wolf form to kill Bloody Mary, corners him in an office, where he demands a fair trial at the Woodlands. Bigby brings the Crooked Man either dead or alive before the assembled Fables of Woodlands at the Business Office, where he and Snow are forced to defend their actions against claims from the Fables. Bigby recounts Vivian's and Georgie's confessions regarding the Crooked Man's involvement, but his word is deemed untrustworthy. Nerissa appears and testifies that she and five other women heard the Crooked Man order the murders. Their testimonies are considered sufficient to believe what Bigby did was right. If the Crooked Man is alive, Bigby is allowed to choose his form of punishment: locking him up forever, slice his neck open and kill him, or throwing him down the Witching Well (used to dispose of dead Fables).

In the epilogue, Snow becomes the new Deputy Mayor and deals with the fallout of the Crooked Man's actions, while Bigby sees off the Fables being taken back to the Farm. Nerissa approaches him and admits that she, Faith and Lily concocted a plan to blackmail Georgie and the Crooked Man for their freedom, using a picture of Lily and Crane together, but Georgie killed the two women when she panicked and revealed their plot to him. Nerissa left Faith's head at the Woodlands to get Bigby involved, as she knew if anyone had a chance to go toe-to-toe with the Crooked Man and come out on top, it was Bigby, and gave false testimony to have the Crooked Man punished, convinced that he was the one who ordered their deaths but lacking the evidence to prove it. She explains that, while yes, Bigby has his faults, but without him, Fabletown would not have survived . If not for him fighting the unjust and his own inner demons for the good of the community, everyone would be dead due to action from people like the Crooked man. Leaving, she comments that Bigby is not as bad as everyone says he is, causing Bigby to recall Faith's similar words to him and question Nerissa's true identity hinting that Faith isn't really dead.

Episodes
Episodic releases for the Microsoft Windows, Xbox 360, OS X and PlayStation 3 platforms were released near-simultaneously within the same week; the iOS and PlayStation Vita episodic releases were expected to trail these by about a month or so.

Development
In 2011, Telltale Games announced that it had acquired licenses to develop video games based on two comic book series, The Walking Dead by Robert Kirkman, and Fables by Bill Willingham. This announcement came around the same time that the television series The Walking Dead became critically successful, leading to Telltale to put much of their initial focus on developing The Walking Dead property through 2011 and 2012. This game was released by April 2012, and was a critical success for Telltale. With The Walking Dead shipping, the company then started working on their Fables title, but according to Telltale's Job Stauffer, they struggled with the narrative of the title over a year and a half. Stauffer said at one point, they found the game to be more of a comedy, but without much humorous substance and in an un-shippable state. Stauffer said that their team rallied together to refocus the game, delaying it from an early 2012 release to late 2012, and ultimately to October 2013 when it finally shipped. This did allow for Telltale to incorporate mechanics that had proven successful in The Walking Dead into their Fables game.

Due to these delays, Telltale re-announced the Fables game at the New York Comic Con in October 2012. The name The Wolf Among Us was revealed in March 2013, and is based on the main character Bigby Wolf.

Pre-orders were made available October 3, 2013 from Telltale Games and Steam. Those who pre-ordered through Telltale received a collector's DVD at the end of the season.

The game was initially released across five episodes between October 2013 and July 2014 for Microsoft Windows, PlayStation 3, and Xbox 360 platforms.

Release announcements and dates

Reception

The Wolf Among Us has received mostly positive reviews from critics. Praise was given to the game's story, action sequences, atmosphere, visual style and faithfulness to the source material while criticism was focused on its pacing and technical issues.

Episode 1 – Faith
Episode 1 – Faith received positive reviews from critics. Review aggregator website Metacritic gave the PlayStation 3 version 85/100, the PC version 85/100, and the Xbox 360 version 82/100.

Episode 2 – Smoke and Mirrors
Episode 2 – Smoke and Mirrors received mixed to positive reviews from critics. Metacritic gave the PlayStation 3 version 82/100, the PC version 76/100, and the Xbox 360 version 73/100.

Episode 3 – A Crooked Mile
Episode 3 – A Crooked Mile received positive reviews. Metacritic gave the PlayStation 3 version 82/100, the PC version 82/100, and the Xbox 360 version 77/100.

Episode 4 – In Sheep's Clothing
Episode 4 – In Sheep's Clothing received mixed to positive reviews from critics. Metacritic gave the PC version 75/100, the Xbox 360 version 74/100, and the PlayStation 3 version 69/100.

Episode 5 – Cry Wolf
Episode 5 – Cry Wolf received positive reviews from critics. Metacritic gave the PC version 84/100, the Xbox 360 version 85/100, and the PlayStation 3 version 75/100.

Awards
The series was nominated for Outstanding Achievement in Story and Adventure Game of the Year for the 18th Annual D.I.C.E. Awards by the Academy of Interactive Arts & Sciences.

The series was nominated for two 2014 BAFTA Games Awards for Story and Performer (Adam Harrington as Bigby Wolf), losing both to The Last of Us: Left Behind.

At the 2014 National Academy of Video Game Trade Reviewers (NAVGTR) awards the game won Direction in a Game Cinema and received six nominations: Writing in a Drama (Pierre Shorette), Performance in a Drama, Lead (Adam Harrington), Original Dramatic Score, Franchise (Jared Emerson-Johnson), Game, Original Adventure (Joe Pinney), Camera Direction in a Game Engine (Dennis Lenart) and Art Direction, Contemporary (David Bogan).

Comic adaptation

At the 2014 New York Comic Con, Vertigo Comics announced that they will be adapting The Wolf Among Us into comic form, to be released digitally first in December 2014 and later as print comic. The story was adapted for the comic by Lilah Sturges, who has previously written for the Fables series, and Dave Justus, staying otherwise true to the game's story but exploring some of the characters and back story in more depth. The comic has since been completed.

Sequel

When The Wolf Among Us was completed by July 2014, Telltale had thought of doing a second season, but they had already committed to the projects leading to Tales from the Borderlands, Minecraft: Story Mode, and Game of Thrones. The company was aware of strong interest in a second season through the intervening years, and they were looking for the right time to develop it.

A second yet-to-be-named season was announced during the July 2017 San Diego Comic Con, and was originally set to premiere in 2018 for personal computers, consoles, and mobile devices. Both Harrington and Yvette were to return to voice Bigby and Snow White, respectively. Stauffer said that Season Two would not resolve the apparent cliffhanger related to Nerissa's connection to Faith; he said that it was meant to be ending similar to a film noir work that made the viewer think about the implications, but never saw this themselves as a cliffhanger. Instead, Season 2 would have continued on with more narrative related to Bigby and Snow White.
By May 2018, Telltale announced that due to recent internal studio issues, they had to push back the release of the sequel until 2019. In September 2018, Telltale had a majority studio closure due to "insurmountable challenges", cancelling The Wolf Among Uss second season among other projects in development.

Upon Telltale's revival by LCG Entertainment, The Wolf Among Us was one of the titles reacquired by LCG, but no announcement was made at that time about the sequel. The company announced The Wolf Among Us 2 at The Game Awards 2019. The sequel will continue events after the first game, though still remain as a prequel to the comic series. The game is being developed in association with AdHoc Studio, formed by former Telltale Games staff, who will focus on the game's narrative and cinematic elements while Telltale will implement the gameplay and other designs. In addition to returning Telltale staff, Harrington and Yvette will return to voice Bigby and Snow White, and Emerson-Johnson will compose music for the game. The game is being developed on the Unreal Engine, and will be released in an episodic approach. This sequel will be worked completely from scratch, using none of the ideas and initial work that had been done under the former Telltale banner before its closure. Unlike the past development cycle approach at the former Telltale where each episode was developed in a standalone fashion, all episodes of The Wolf Among Us 2 are being developed simultaneously. The game is set to be released in 2024.

References

External links
Telltale's The Wolf Among Us website

2013 video games
Detective video games
Episodic video games
Fables (comics)
Interactive movie video games
IOS games
Mystery video games
Neo-noir video games
MacOS games
PlayStation 3 games
PlayStation 4 games
PlayStation Vita games
PlayStation Network games
Point-and-click adventure games
Single-player video games
Telltale Games games
Video games with cel-shaded animation
Video games based on DC Comics
Video games developed in the United States
Video games scored by Jared Emerson-Johnson
Video games set in 1986
Video games set in New York City
Video games about police officers
Werewolf video games
Windows games
Xbox 360 games
Xbox 360 Live Arcade games
Xbox One games
Video games adapted into comics